Guernica (stylized GUERNICA) was a Japanese band formed in 1981. The trio consisted of vocalist Togawa Jun, composer and violinist Koji Ueno, and lyricist and art director Keiichi Ohta. They are presumably named after the famous painting Guernica by Pablo Picasso. The band performed avant-garde pastiche of inter-war European music, sometimes substituting synthesizers for an orchestra. They borrowed futurist, communist, and fascist aesthetics to recall the European and Asian inter-war and wartime period.

Discography
1982.06.21 - Kaizou eno Yakudou (A Lively Thrust Towards Reconstruction)
1982.06.21 -  Ginrin wa Utau c/w Marronnier Tokuhon
1988.07.21 - Shinseiki eno Unga (Canal to the New Century)
1989.03.05 - Denrisou karano Manazashi (Regards from the Ionosphere)

External links
Official Site (Japanese)
discogs 

Japanese rock music groups